Phillip Anthony O'Meara (born 13 June 1951) is an Australian former cricketer. He played one first-class match for Western Australia in the 1978 Sheffield Shield against Queensland at the Gabba, making 29 runs all-up. O'Meara also played grade cricket for the Fremantle District Cricket Club in the Western Australian Grade Cricket competition. He holds the record for the most runs made in a season for the club: 834 runs in the 1978–79 season. He is the current vice-president of the Victorian Sub-District Cricket Association.

References

External links
 

1951 births
Australian cricketers
Living people
People from Kellerberrin, Western Australia
Western Australia cricketers
Cricketers from Western Australia